The Drowning Pool is a 1975 American thriller film directed by Stuart Rosenberg, and based upon Ross Macdonald's novel of the same name. The film stars Paul Newman, Joanne Woodward, and Anthony Franciosa, and is a loose sequel to Harper. The setting is shifted from California to Louisiana.

Plot
Los Angeles-based private investigator Lew Harper flies to Louisiana to do a job for his former lover, Iris Devereaux. She believes the family's ex-chauffeur is the person who is blackmailing her with the knowledge that she has cheated on her husband. The husband does not care, but his mother, Olivia Devereaux, is the family matriarch and runs the family estate with an unforgiving iron grip.

Even before his investigation begins, Harper is propositioned in his motel room by a teenaged girl. He sends her away, but later he discovers that the teenager is Iris Devereaux's daughter, Schuyler. Their meeting in the motel room brings Harper to the attention of police chief Broussard and the disagreeable Lieutenant Franks. Broussard accepts Harper's explanation, but tells him he will be following what Harper does, as he has a personal interest in the Devereaux family.

Harper is abducted by two hoods working for the oil magnate J.Hugh Kilbourne, who thinks Harper might be useful in his efforts to get ownership of some of Olivia Devereaux's oil-rich properties, which she is content to maintain as bird sanctuaries. Harper is noncommittal towards Kilbourne, and the hoods return him to his car. On Harper's return, he learns that the dead body of Olivia Devereaux has just been found and the police's prime suspect is the ex-chauffeur.

While searching for the chauffeur, Harper is abducted again, this time by hoods working for a mysterious woman. He does not have any useful information for her and is released; he later finds out she is Mavis Kilbourne, the wife of the oil magnate. She is working behind her husband's back trying to find an account book containing information of his illicit business dealings, which he is desperate to recover and would kill her over if he knew she had a hand in its disappearance.

Harper tracks down the chauffeur, Pat Reavis. He finds Reavis with $10,000 in his possession and believes that Reavis was paid to kill Olivia. He calls the police to say that he's bringing Reavis in and makes Reavis drive at gunpoint. En route, Reavis denies involvement in blackmailing Iris and murdering Olivia, claiming he was only at the scene of the murder because he had been having an affair with Schuyler. However, he admits to having information that he expects will yield a lot of money, and offers Harper a share of it if he will let him go. The car they are in is forced off the road by masked gunmen, who shoot Reavis dead but miss Harper, who wounds one of the gunmen. The next day he is informed by Broussard that, mysteriously, there was no report made to the police of any gunfight, but that Lt. Franks has been injured in a "hunting accident".

Despite Iris's pleading with him to give up on the case and go home, Harper continues investigating. He correctly deduces that Reavis came into possession of the missing account book and must have given it to a trusted girlfriend for safekeeping. Knowing that Franks was involved in the killing of Reavis, Harper ambushes Franks in his own home and forces him to admit that he does jobs for Kilbourne. When Harper later confronts Kilbourne with the information, the oil magnate admits to having hired Reavis, but insists it was only to spy on Olivia Devereaux, not to kill her. When Harper tells Kilbourne he knows about the missing account book, Kilbourne offers him a fortune for it, but Harper just walks away.

This leads to Kilbourne and his henchman kidnapping Harper and Mavis to find out where the notebook is, torturing them with a fire hose in an abandoned asylum. When Harper refuses to give up any information, Kilbourne leaves them overnight to suffer. During this time, Harper uses their clothes to plug the drain, and he and Mavis flood the room in an attempt to reach the skylight. When the water is finally high enough, they find that they can't break the window, and are near drowning when they are ironically saved by Kilbourne returning to torture them more. Harper gives Kilbourne's gun to Mavis, asking her to watch him while Harper finds a phone to call for help. As Kilbourne brags to Harper that he has too much influence and that he'll get away with it all, shots suddenly ring out. Harper returns to find Kilbourne dead, with Mavis admitting that "He's right, he would've gotten away with it".

Returning to the Devereaux estate, Harper finds that Iris has committed suicide in the night with a combination of sleeping pills and alcohol. Chief Broussard is also there, devastated. Broussard asks Harper, "Did she tell you about us?", to which Harper replies, "She didn't have to". Harper confronts Schuyler in the bird sanctuary, where she has released all of Olivia's birds into the wild. Harper lays out how Schuyler was behind the whole affair, and she insists that "they really did a job on" her father before admitting that she hated both her mother and her grandmother. Harper then reveals that Broussard has been listening the whole time. Broussard lets Schuyler go and lashes out at Harper, before breaking down in tears and confirming that he is Schuyler's real father. Harper tells Broussard, "That's YOUR kid out there. How are you gonna handle that?" before leaving.

Harper visits Reavis' girlfriend, Gretchen, giving her $9200 (the $10,000 he confiscated from Reavis, minus the $800 in expenses he racked up during the case). He asks Gretchen to send the account book to "the biggest newspaper in New Orleans". The film ends with Gretchen telling Harper, "you're not such a tough guy."

Cast

Production
The novel was published in 1950. The New York Times called it one of the best mysteries of the year.

In 1966, a film was made of a Lew Archer novel called Harper, starring Paul Newman. The character of Archer was renamed "Harper" for the movie. It was based on a script by William Goldman, who then wrote a follow-up Archer adaptation, based on The Chill, but that movie was never made.

In April 1973, producers David Foster and Lawrence Turman announced they had optioned the rights to the novel The Drowning Pool for director Robert Mulligan and had hired Walter Hill to adapt it. Hill did a draft, saying he "tried to toughen up the material and put a little more muscle in Lew Archer's pants, which was probably a mistake. Certainly, the studio and the producers ended up feeling that way; their main criticism was MacDonald's fans don't respond to physical action. They may have been right, but I thought going in the direction they wanted with the script was a highway to dullsville." Hill said this prompted him to "more or less jump ship" to go and make his directorial debut Hard Times.

Hill says that when he became involved, Paul Newman was not attached to the film, and that when Hill left the project, so did Mulligan.

Eventually, Paul Newman agreed to star. This meant the film was co-produced by First Artists at Warner Bros. By July 1974, Joanne Woodward had agreed to co-star and Lorenzo Semple had rewritten the script. Producer Foster says it was Woodward's suggestion to relocate the story from California to Louisiana, as she felt it would offer a point of difference.

By September 1974, Tracy Keenan Wynn, who had earned a strong reputation writing TV movies, was working on the screenplay. Hill said that later Eric Roth did some writing on it.

Jack Garfein said his agent pitched Garfein to direct the movie and Newman was agreeable, but then Stuart Rosenberg approached Newman asking for the job, saying he was going through personal problems and was "desperate" for the job, so Newman chose Rosenberg.

Originally, the plan was to call the lead character "Dave Ryan" so the film would not be confused as a sequel to Harper. Then a few weeks before preproduction, it was decided that it was "foolish to make this change" (Foster) and the character ended up being called "Harper".

Newman said, "a character like Harper is very easy. It's great fun to get up in the morning and play Harper."

The film was shot in late 1974. Location filming occurred in Lafayette and New Orleans. The melody to the international hit song "Killing Me Softly with His Song" is heard playing in the background of several scenes in the film.

At the time the film was being made, Paramount was producing a TV series based on the Lew Archer novels starring Brian Keith.

Before the movie came out, a film buyer said, "You're sure it's going to be a disaster because Stuart Rosenberg — ooh! What has Stuart Rosenberg got on Paul Newman? I mean, after WUSA, how could anyone...? This man has got to be the Otto Preminger of grade-B movies. He just hasn't made a commercial movie in years, and people still give him big properties."

Hill later estimated that only two minor scenes in the film were true to his adaptation. He said, "[he] wasn't too crazy about the movie."

Reception
The movie was nominated as best picture of the year by the Edgar Allan Poe Awards.

A.H. Weiler of  The New York Times said in the review: "Under Stuart Rosenberg's muscular but pedestrian direction, the script, adapted from (Ross Macdonald's) 1950 novel, transports our hero from his native California to present-day New Orleans and its bayou environs. ... Of course, Mr. Newman's Harper survives beatings, traps, and a variety of enticing offers with quips, charm, and inherent decency projected in underplayed, workman-like style. If his performance is not outstanding, it is a shade more convincing than the characterizations of the other principals, who emerge as odd types and not as fully fleshed, persuasive individuals. ... Unfortunately, the performances and such authentic facets as Cajun talk, bayous, New Orleans and an imposing, white-pillared, antebellum mansion set amid wide lawns and ancient live oaks, serve only to make The Drowning Pool a mildly interesting diversion."

Roger Ebert gave the film a mixed 2-stars out of a possible 4 rating. He wrote that the basic premise of The Drowning Pool was "straightforward thriller material, and could have made a decent B movie, but since "The Drowning Pool" is a Paul Newman vehicle, it goes first class, and that turns out to be fatal. So much attention is given to making the movie look good visually that the story gets mislaid..."

Stanley Kauffmann of The New Republic described The Drowning Pool as a 'rotten thriller'.

The film was a disappointment at the box office in the United States and Canada, earning rentals of $2.6 million, but it performed better elsewhere, especially in Italy, France, Spain, and South Africa, and was expected to earn worldwide rentals of $8 million.

Home media
The Drowning Pool was released on November 14, 2006, as part of the Paul Newman Collection DVD box set.

See also
 List of American films of 1975

References

External links
 
 
 
 
 

1975 films
1970s mystery thriller films
American detective films
American mystery thriller films
American sequel films
Films based on American novels
Films based on mystery novels
Films directed by Stuart Rosenberg
Films set in Louisiana
Films shot in Louisiana
Films shot in New Orleans
First Artists films
Films with screenplays by Lorenzo Semple Jr.
Warner Bros. films
Films scored by Michael Small
Films with screenplays by Walter Hill
American neo-noir films
1970s English-language films
1970s American films